Swingin' New Big Band is a 1966 live album by Buddy Rich and his big band.

Track listing
LP side A:
"Ready Mix" (Bill Holman) – 3:22
"Basically Blues" (Phil Wilson) – 5:39
"Critic's Choice" (Oliver Nelson) – 3:28
"My Man's Gone Now" (George Gershwin, Ira Gershwin, DuBose Heyward) – 3:05
"Uptight (Everything's Alright)" (Henry Cosby, Sylvia Moy, Stevie Wonder) – 2:49
LP side B:
"Sister Sadie" (Horace Silver) – 3:15
"More Soul" (King Curtis, Nelson) – 4:19
West Side Story Medley (Leonard Bernstein, Stephen Sondheim) – 10:48 
"Overture"
"Cool"
"Something's Coming"
"Somewhere" 
9 bonus tracks added to 1996 CD re-issue:
"What'd I Say" (Ray Charles) – 2:56
"Hoe Down" (Nelson) – 2:47
"Step Right Up" (Nelson) – 3:17
"Apples (aka Gino)" (Arthur M. Wiggins) – 2:32
"Chicago (That Toddlin' Town)" (Fred Fisher) – 2:26
"In a Mellow Tone" (Duke Ellington) – 3:47
"Never Will I Marry" (Frank Loesser) – 2:40
"Lament for Lester" (Jay Corre) – 2:45
"Naptown Blues" (Wes Montgomery) – 3:29

Personnel
The Buddy Rich big band
Gene Quill –  alto saxophone, clarinet
Peter Yellin – alto saxophone, flute
Jay Corre, Martin Flax – tenor saxophone, clarinet, flute
Stephen Perlow – baritone saxophone, bass clarinet
Robert Shew, John Sottile, Yoshito Murakami, Walter Battegello – trumpet
Jim Trimble, John Boice – trombone
Dennis Good, Mike Waverley – bass trombone
John Bunch – piano
Barry Zweig – guitar
Carson Smith – bass
Buddy Rich – drums
Arrangers
Bill Holman
Oliver Nelson
Don Piestrup
Don Rader
Bill Reddie
Arthur M. Wiggins
Phil Wilson
Jay Corre
John Boice
Production
Richard Bock – producer
Woody Woodward – art direction
Wally Heider – engineer
Leonard Feather, Stan Kenton – liner notes
Fred Felgio – photography
Dean Pratt – producer, liner notes, reissue producer
Bob Belden – CD reissue producer

References

Pacific Jazz PJ 10113 (mono), ST 20113 (stereo) (1966 LP)
Pacific Jazz LN-10089 (1981 LP re-issue)
Blue Note 35232 (1996 CD re-issue with bonus tracks)
Swingin' New Big Band at discogs.com
Liberty Records discography at bsnpubs.com

Buddy Rich live albums
1966 live albums
Albums arranged by Oliver Nelson
Pacific Jazz Records live albums